Dhaanto is a style of traditional Somali music and folk dance. It is a cultural folk dance native to Somali people  in the Horn of Africa.

History
The Dhaanto was believed to have been created by the nomadic Abaskuul clan in the now Somali region of Ethiopia. The Dhaanto dance-song was revived in the early 20th century and it was used to raise the 'spirits' of soldiers and was often sung on horseback. Dhaanto became popular in the Somali Region  (Somaali Galbeed) and quickly spread to other Somali  territories in the Horn of Africa. In the Somali region, this dance is very popular and annually you will see ethnic Somalis perform versions of the Dhaanto at the Nations, Nationalities and Peoples’ Day in Jigjiga. Additionally, the genre was employed in Islamic poetry. Modern exponents of the Dhaanto style include the Great Dhaant Singer, Poet and Concert Writer and performer Abdirahman Ali, and the Somali singer-songwriter Abdullahi Abdulle.

Notable musicians
Famous dhaanto artists include Ahmed Budal, Ali Dhaanto, Bashir Carab, Nuur Caraale, Kafeya Sarhay Isaaq, Hodon Ma'allin, Bashir Jaawi, Abdi Dhaanto and Hani UK.

References

Somali culture
Somalian music
African dances